"Stoned at the Nail Salon" is a song by New Zealand singer-songwriter Lorde, released through Universal Music New Zealand on 22 July 2021 as the second single from her third studio album, Solar Power. The song was written and produced by Lorde and Jack Antonoff, and features backing vocals from Phoebe Bridgers, Clairo, Marlon Williams, and Lawrence Arabia.

"Stoned at the Nail Salon" is a folk ballad where Lorde reflects about growing older and the passage of time. Critics were mixed on the song, with some praising what they saw as its "somber", "eloquent" and "graceful" qualities, while others were more negative towards its perceived "dull" and "aimless" nature. Critics also noted the difference between the song and "Solar Power", the single that immediately preceded it, connecting "Stoned at the Nail Salon" to her earlier albums Pure Heroine and Melodrama. Upon its release, "Stoned at the Nail Salon" appeared on record charts in Australia, Ireland, New Zealand, and the United Kingdom.

Background
The tracklist for Lorde's third studio album, Solar Power, was announced on 21 June 2021, with "Stoned at the Nail Salon" as the album's fourth track. Lorde announced the release of "Stoned at the Nail Salon" as the second single from Solar Power on 20 July 2021 via her website, with the release date set for 22 July 2021.

Lorde described "Stoned at the Nail Salon" upon its release as a "rumination on getting older, settling into domesticity, and questioning if you’ve made the right decisions." In an interview with Zane Lowe of Apple Music, Lorde called the song "one of the quietest, most introspective, and internal moments on the record", explaining that "Stoned at the Nail Salon" was about the passage of time, which she thought was "a weird thing to even think about and be in conversation with".

Composition

"Stoned at the Nail Salon" has been described as a folk song with an acoustic style. Laura Snapes from The Guardian described the track as a "prismatic folk song", where Lorde sings about how "all the beautiful girls will fade like the roses". The song is written in the key of D major and has a tempo of 60 beats per minute. Lorde's vocals range from D3 to B4. Like Lorde's previous single, "Solar Power", "Stoned at the Nail Salon" features backing vocals from indie rock singers Phoebe Bridgers and Clairo, as well as Lawrence Arabia and Marlon Williams, the latter of whom were not on "Solar Power". The song features a "simple guitar accompaniment" courtesy of producer Jack Antonoff, who performed both acoustic and electric 6-string guitars on "Stoned at the Nail Salon".

Critical reception

Writing for Rolling Stone, Althea Legaspi and Brittany Spanos called the song "a somber reflection on growing older", labeling it "in opposition" to Lorde's previous single, "Solar Power". Also of Rolling Stone, Angie Martoccio described the song as "wistful, eloquent, and exhilarating", calling "Stoned at the Nail Salon" a "heart-wrenching ballad" in the mould of Lucy Dacus' "Thumbs" and Clairo's "Blouse". Dork'''s Stephen Ackroyd wrote of "Stoned at the Nail Salon" as a "low-key, delicate cut".

In a Billboard article, Hannah Dailey connected the song to Lorde's previous works, opining that it "channels several themes from Lorde's past work", naming "Ribs" and "Liability" specifically. Vulture writer Justin Curto also contrasted the song with "Solar Power", writing that "Stoned in the Nail Salon" is "more in line with the contemplative Lorde we knew on Melodrama and Pure Heroine than the one we met on "Solar Power"".

In a Pitchfork review, Quinn Moreland compared the song's "understated production" to Lana Del Rey's Chemtrails over the Country Club, saying that the song is "most compelling when Lorde lets her anxieties breathe", but concluding by stating that moments like that in the song are few, and that "Stoned in the Nail Salon" ultimately felt "stuck in a pretty, pedicured bubble". Al Newstead of Triple J branded the song a "meditation on aging", contrasting what he called the "summer-soaked, carefree first taste" of "Solar Power" with the "more sombre track" of "Stoned at the Nail Salon", which he compared to "the bleeding heart balladry of 'Liability'".

A Junkee article written by Joseph Earp called "Stoned at the Nail Salon" the autumn to the "burning summer" of "Solar Power", remarking that the song "works its magic in the background", comparing it to "a haze of pot smoke". In Flood, Margaret Farrell commented that the song was a "graceful ballad about getting high", where Lorde sings about the passage of time "over a tenderly plucked electric guitar".

Alexis Petridis of The Guardian wrote that "Stoned at the Nail Salon" had "softly yearning power". Writing for The Daily Telegraph, Neil McCormick said that "folky jaunt Stoned at the Nail Salon toys lightly with regret". In The Independent, Helen Brown opined that the production of Jack Antonoff "trickles out aimless arpeggios on "Stoned at the Nail Salon" as Lorde sighs over growing out of the songs she loved at 16 and sounds like she’s already bored by the one she’s singing", remarking that the song felt "sun-bleached of melody". A Spin article by Bobby Olivier called the track "decidedly dull in its acoustic musings".

Commercial performance
In Lorde's home country of New Zealand, "Stoned at the Nail Salon" debuted at number 33 in the week of 2 August 2021 on Recorded Music NZ's Official Top 40 Singles chart, later re-entering and peaking at number 22 in the week of 30 August 2021 following the album's release. In the same week of its debut, the song also topped the Hot 20 NZ Singles chart, which tracks the 20 "fastest-moving" tracks by New Zealand artists. "Stoned at the Nail Salon" also charted in Australia after its release, appearing at number 74 on the ARIA Singles Chart and later peaking at number 60 following Solar Powers release.

The song charted at number 80 on the Ireland Singles Top 100 chart in the week ending 30 July 2021, and returned and repeaked on the same chart at number 75 after the release of Solar Power. In the United States, the song debuted at number 42 on the Billboard Hot Rock & Alternative Songs chart in the week of 31 July 2021, before moving up to a peak of number 18 the next week. After the release of Solar Power, Stoned at the Nail Salon appeared at number 85 on the Official Charts Company's UK Singles Chart.

Live performances
Lorde performed the song live on Late Night with Seth Meyers on 22 July 2021 with Jack Antonoff. On 6 August 2021, she released a performance of the track alongside Jack Antonoff on the roof of Electric Lady Studios in New York City, where Lorde, according to Claire Shaffer of Rolling Stone, "sings the contemplative track surrounded by lush tropical plants, while Antonoff accompanies her on electric guitar". Billboard writer Hannah Dailey described the performance as "delicate", and called it a "dreamy acoustic version" of "Stoned at the Nail Salon".

Track listing
Streaming
 "Stoned at the Nail Salon" – 4:26
 "Solar Power" – 3:12

Credits and personnel
Credits adapted from Tidal.

 Lorde – vocals, songwriting, production
 Jack Antonoff – songwriting, production, bass, acoustic guitar, electric 6-string, Mellotron, piano, mixing
 Phoebe Bridgers – background vocals
 Clairo – background vocals
 Lawrence Arabia – background vocals
 Marlon Williams – background vocals
 Laura Sisk – mixing
 Chris Gehringer – mastering
 Will Quinnell – mastering

Charts

Release history

Mata Kohore / Stoned at the Nail Salon

"Mata Kohore / Stoned at the Nail Salon'" is a song recorded by New Zealand singer-songwriter Lorde. It is the third track from her Te Ao Mārama'' EP, and is performed fully in the Māori language. Dx7 contributes vocals to the song, while Marlon Williams and Bic Runga are featured as backing vocalists.

Background and lyrics
The song was translated into Māori by Hana Mereraiha, who called the English title a "metaphor for over-thinking stuff", and explained the Māori translation of the title as " means sort of red eyes but also blurry-eyes, so when you’re not quite seeing clearly – maybe you’re over-thinking, or not seeing things so clearly".

Credits and personnel
Credits adapted from Tidal.

 Lorde – vocals, songwriting, production
 Jack Antonoff – songwriting, production, bass, acoustic guitar, electric 6-string, Mellotron, piano, mixing
 Dx7 – vocals
 Bic Runga – background vocals
 Marlon Williams – background vocals
 Laura Sisk – mixing
 Chris Gehringer – mastering
 Will Quinnell – mastering

Charts

References

2020s ballads
2021 singles
2021 songs
Folk ballads
Lorde songs
New Zealand folk songs
Song recordings produced by Lorde
Song recordings produced by Jack Antonoff
Songs about drugs
Songs written by Lorde
Songs written by Jack Antonoff